Mustafa Akçay (born 20 September 1983) is a Turkish footballer who plays as a midfielder for Kreisliga club Türkspor Nürtingen.

External links
 Mustafa Akçay at Kickers-Archiv

1983 births
Living people
Sportspeople from Trabzon
Stuttgarter Kickers II players
Stuttgarter Kickers players
Turkish footballers
Association football midfielders